This is a list of agricultural varieties of hemp.

For European production 
Adzelvieši
Armanca
Asso
Austa SK
Beniko
Bialobrzeskie (Białobrzeskie)
Cannakomp
Carma
Carmagnola (Carmagnola selezionata), an Italian dioecious variety
Carmaleonte
Chamaeleon
Codimono
CS
Dacia Secuieni
Delta-405
Delta-llosa
Denise
Diana
Dioica 88
Earlina 8 FC
Eletta Campana
Epsilon 68
Fedora 17, a French dioecious variety
Felina 32, a French dioecious variety
Ferimon (Férimon), a French dioecious variety
Fibranova, an Italian dioecious variety
Fibrante
Fibrol
Fibror 79
Finola
Futura 75
Glecia
Gliana
Glyana
Henola
Ivory
KC Bonusz
KC Dora
KC Virtus
KC Zuzana
KCA Borana
Kompolti hibrid TC
Kompolti
Lipko
Lovrin 110
Marcello
Markant
Monoica
Rajan
Ratza
Santhica 23
Santhica 27
Santhica 70
Secuieni Jubileu
Silvana
Succesiv
Szarvasi
Tiborszallasi
Tisza
Tygra
Uniko B
Uso-31
Villanova
Wielkopolskie
Wojko
Zenit

For Canadian production 
Alyssa, Anka, CanMa, CFX1, CFX2, CRS1, Dolores, Jutta and Yvonne
X59

Approved cultivars in 2018 
The following cultivars were approved by the national government for the 2018 growing season:

Altair
Alyssa
Angie
Anka
CFX-1
CFX-2
CRS-1
CS
CanMa
Canda
Carmagnola
Carmen
Crag
Delores
Deni
ESTA-1
FINOLA
Fasamo
Fedrina 74
Felina 34
Ferimon
Fibranova
Fibriko
Fibrimon 24
Fibrimon 56
Georgina
GranMa
Grandi
Joey
Judy
Jutta
Katani
Kompolti
Kompolti Hibrid TC
Kompolti Sargaszaru
Laura Secord
Lovrin 110
Martha
Petera
Picolo
Quida
Silesia
UC-RGM
USO 14
USO 31
Uniko B
Victoria
X-59 (Hemp Nut)
Yvonne
 11
Zolotonosha 15

For Japanese production
Tochigishiro

References

Cannabis-related lists

Lists of cultivars